The Tigri Area is a wooded area that has been disputed by Guyana and Suriname since around 1840. It involves the area between the Upper Corentyne River (also called the New River), the Coeroeni River, and the Kutari River. This triangular area is known as the New River Triangle in Guyana. In 1969 the conflict ran high on, and since then it has been controlled by Guyana and claimed by Suriname. In 1971, both governments agreed that they would continue talks over the border issue and withdraw their military forces from the disputed triangle. Guyana has never held upon this agreement.

In Suriname it is seen as a part of the Coeroeni Resort located in the Sipaliwini District, while Guyana views it as part of the region of East Berbice-Corentyne.

History
The Anglo-Dutch Treaty of 1814 set the border between British Guiana and Suriname as the Courantyne River. The treaty was signed and ratified by both parties. Robert Schomburgk surveyed British Guiana's borders in 1840. Taking the Courantyne River as the border, he sailed up to which he deemed its source, the Kutari River, in order to delineate the boundary. In 1871, however, Charles Barrington Brown discovered the New River or Upper Corentyne, which is the source of the Corentyne River. Thus the Tigri Area or New River Triangle dispute was born.

The tribunal which dealt with the Venezuela Crisis of 1895 also awarded the New River Triangle to British Guiana. The Netherlands, however, raised a diplomatic protest, claiming that the New River, and not the Kutari, was to be regarded as the source of the Corentyne and the boundary. The British government replied that the issue was already settled by the acceptance of the Kutari as the boundary.

In 1936, a Mixed Commission established by the British and Dutch government agreed to award the full width of the Corentyne River to Suriname, as per the 1799 agreement. The territorial sea boundary was deemed to prolongate 10° from Point No. 61,  from the shore. The New River Triangle, however, was completely awarded to Guyana. The treaty putting this agreement into law was never ratified, because of the outbreak of World War II. The Dutch representative Conrad Carel Käyser signed an agreement with British and Brazilian representatives, placing the tri-point junction near the source of the Kutari River. Desiring to put the border issue to a closure before British Guiana would gain independence, the British government restarted negotiations in 1961. The British position asserted "Dutch sovereignty over the Corentyne River, a 10° line dividing the territorial sea, and British control over the New River Triangle." The Netherlands replied with a formal claim to the New River Triangle, but with an additional thalweg boundary in the Corentyne River (the latter position has never been repeated by any Surinamese government). No agreements were made and Guyana became independent with its borders unresolved.

In the present village of Kuruni near the Coeroenie Airstrip, prefab houses were placed for workers on a planned weir. Work also began on a camp near the Oronoque River. On 12 December 1967, four armed men of the Guyana police force landed at Oronoque, and ordered the workers to leave the area. Four military posts were initially established by the Surinamese army, however (mainly for financial reasons) only Camp Tigri (also known as Camp Jaguar) remained.  On 19 August 1969, border skirmishes occurred between Guyanese forces and Surinamese militias at Camp Tigri, which was subsequently conquered by Guyana. On 18 March 1970, Eric Williams, Prime Minister of Trinidad and Tobago offered to mediate the conflict. In November 1970 the Surinamese and Guyanese governments agreed in Trinidad and Tobago to withdraw their military forces from the Triangle. Prior to Suriname's independence in 1975, President Henck Arron asked Prime Minister Joop den Uyl of the Netherlands for a precise definition of the borders. The reply included the Tigri area. Guyana has not held upon this agreement and continues to hold a firm grip on the New River Triangle.

Villages

The indigenous villages of Kasuela and Sakuru of the Tiriyó tribe are located inside the Tigri area. Kasuela is the oldest village of Western Trio Group and is located on an island in the middle of the New River. The village is also known as Casuela, and Cashew Island. Camp Tigri known in Guyana as Camp Jaguar, is located to the north of the village.

The village of Sakuru was founded in 2008 by a group of people from Kwamalasamutu.

References